The 2016 Korean Sevens was the second leg of the Asian Rugby Sevens Series for the year. It was the first time the Korean Sevens tournament was included in the series. The event was held at Incheon in the Namdong Asiad Rugby Stadium

Hong Kong won the second leg of the series after they defeated Sri Lanka 36–0 to open up a four-point lead heading into the final round at Colombo.

Pool Stage

Pool A

Pool B

Knockout stage

Plate

Cup

References

2016 Asian Seven Series
2016
rugby union
2016 in Asian rugby union